The International Exhibition of Navigation, Commerce and Industry in Liverpool, England, was opened by Queen Victoria on 11 May 1886.

The fair was held in Antwerp's exhibition hall which was transported for the exhibition and erected alongside Wavertree Botanic Gardens.

Exhibitions from parts of the British Empire outside the United Kingdom included an African village, 50 "natives of Indian and Ceylon", camel and elephant rides, and a Canadian toboggan ride

It was followed in 1887 by the Royal Jubilee Exhibition also in Liverpool.

References

External links
 Liverpool International Exhibition Souvenir Book
 Liverpool Shipperies Exhibition with drawings and anecdotes of the event

World's fairs in England
1886 in England
History of Liverpool
1880s in Liverpool
Festivals established in 1886